Format of entries is:
 ICAO (IATA) – Airport Name – Airport Location

HA - Ethiopia 

 HAAB (ADD) – Bole International Airport – Addis Ababa
 HAAL       – Lideta Army Airport – Addis Ababa
 HAAM (AMH) – Arba Minch Airport – Arba Minch
 HAAX (AXU) – Axum Airport – Axum
 HABD (BJR) – Bahir Dar Airport – Bahir Dar
 HABE (BEI) – Beica Airport – Beica
 HABU (BCY) – Bulchi Airport – Bulchi
 HADC (DSE) – Combolcha Airport – Dessie
 HADD (DEM) – Dembidolo Airport – Dembidolo
 HADM (DBM) – Debre Marqos Airport – Debre Marqos
 HADR (DIR) – Aba Tenna Dejazmach Yilma International Airport – Dire Dawa
 HADT (DBT) – Debre Tabor Airport – Debre Tabor
 HAFN (FNH) – Fincha Airport – Finicha'a
 HAGB (GOB) – Robe Airport – Goba
 HAGH (GNN) – Ghinnir Airport – Ghinnir
 HAGM (GMB) – Gambela Airport – Gambela
 HAGN (GDQ) – Gondar Airport – Gondar
 HAGO (GDE) – Gode Airport (military) – Gode
 HAGR (GOR) – Gore Airport – Gore
 HAHM (QHR) – Harar Meda Airport – Debre Zeyit
 HAHU (HUE) – Humera Airport – Humera
 HAJM (JIM) – Aba Segud Airport – Jimma
 HAKD (ABK) – Kabri Dar Airport – Kabri Dar
 HAKL (LFO) – Kelafo Airport – Kelafo
 HALA (AWA) – Awasa Airport – Awasa
 HALL (LLI) – Lalibela Airport – Lalibela
 HAMK (MQX) – Alula Aba Nega Airport – Mek'ele
 HAMN (NDM) – Mendi Airport – Mendi
 HAMT (MTF) – Mizan Teferi Airport – Mizan Teferi
 HANG (EGL) – Neghele Airport (military) – Negele Boran
 HANJ (NEJ) – Nejjo Airport – Nejo
 HANK (NEK) – Nekemte Airport – Nekemte
 HASO (ASO) – Asosa Airport – Asosa
 HATP (TIE) – Tippi Airport – Tippi
 HAWC (WAC) – Wacca Airport – Wacca

HB - Burundi 

 HBBA (BJM) – Bujumbura International Airport – Bujumbura
 HBBE (GID) – Gitega Airport – Gitega
 HBBO (KRE) – Kirundo Airport – Kirundo

HC - Somalia 

 HCGR (GGR) – Garowe Airport – Garowe
 HCMA (ALU) – Alula Airport – Alula
 HCMB (BIB) – Baidoa Airport – Baidoa
 HCMC (CXN) – Candala Airport – Candala (Qandala)
 HCMD (BSY) – Bardera Airport – Bardera
 HCME (HCM) – Eyl Airport – Eyl (Eil)
 HCMF (BSA) – Bender Qassim International Airport – Bosaso
 HCMG (GSR) – Qardho Airport – Qardho (Gardo)
 HCMH (HGA) – Hargeisa International Airport – Hargeisa
 HCMI (BBO) – Berbera Airport – Berbera
 HCMJ (LGX) – Lugh Ganane Airport – Lugh Ganane (Luuq)
 HCMK (KMU) – Kismayo Airport – Kismayo (Kisimayu)
 HCMM (MGQ) – Aden Adde International Airport – Mogadishu
 HCMN       – Beledweyne Airport (Ugas Khalif Airport) – Beledweyne
 HCMO (CMO) – Obbia Airport – Obbia (Hobyo)
 HCMR (GLK) – Abdullahi Yusuf International Airport – Galkayo
 HCMS (CMS) – Iskushuban Airport – Iskushuban (Scusciuban)
 HCMU (ERA) – Erigavo Airport – Erigavo
 HCMV (BUO) – Burao Airport – Burao
 HCMT (BXX) – Borama Airport  – Borama

HD - Djibouti 

 HDAG       – Assa-Gueyla Airport – Assa-Gueyla
 HDAM (JIB) – Djibouti-Ambouli International Airport – Djibouti City
 HDAS (AII) – Ali-Sabieh Airport – Ali-Sabieh
 HDCH       – Chabelley Airport – Chabelley
 HDDK       – Dikhil Airport – Dikhil
 HDHE       – Herkale Airport – Herkale
 HDMO (MHI) – Moucha Airport – Moucha Island
 HDOB (OBC) – Obock Airport – Obock
 HDTJ (TDJ) – Tadjoura Airport – Tadjoura

HE - Egypt 

 HEAL (DBB) – Al Alamain International Airport – El Alamein
 HEAR (AAC) – El Arish International Airport – El Arish
 HEAT (ATZ) – Assiut Airport – Assiut
 HEAX (ALY) – El Nouzha Airport – Alexandria
 HEBA (HBE) – Borg El Arab Airport – Alexandria
 HEBL (ABS) – Abu Simbel Airport – Abu Simbel
 HECA (CAI) – Cairo International Airport – Cairo
 HECP (CCE) – Capital International Airport – Proposed new capital of Egypt
 HECW (CWE) – Cairo West Air Base – Cairo
 HEGN (HRG) – Hurghada Airport – Hurghada
 HEGO (HGO) – El Gona Airport – Hurghada
 HEGR       – El Gora Airport – El Gorah
 HEKG (UVL) – El Kharga Airport – El Kharga
 HELX (LXR) – Luxor International Airport – Luxor
 HEMA (RMF) – Marsa Alam International Airport – Marsa Alam
 HEMM (MUH) – Marsa Matruh International Airport – Mersa Matruh
 HEOC       – October Airport – 6th of October City
 HEOW (GSQ) – Sharq Al-Owainat Airport – Sharq Al-Owainat, Egypt
 HEPS (PSD) – Port Said Airport – Port Said
 HESC (SKV) – St. Catherine International Airport – St. Catherine
 HESG (HMB) – Sohag International Airport – Sohag
 HESH (SSH) – Sharm el-Sheikh International Airport – Sharm El Sheikh
 HESN (ASW) – Aswan Airport – Aswan
 HESX (SPX) – Sphinx International Airport – Giza
 HETB (TCP) – Taba International Airport – Taba
 HETR (ELT) – El Tor Airport – El Tor

HH - Eritrea 

 HHAG       – Agordat Airport – Agordat
 HHAS (ASM) – Asmara International Airport – Asmara
 HHMS (MSW) – Massawa International Airport – Massawa
 HHSB (ASA) – Assab International Airport – Assab
 HHTS (TES) – Teseney Airport – Teseney

HJ - South Sudan 

South Sudan obtained a dedicated ICAO airport code prefix, HJ, in 2021. However, many airports continue to use the HS prefix that is used by Sudan.
 HJJJ (JUB)  – Juba International Airport – Juba
 HJMK (MAK)  – Malakal Airport – Malakal
 HJRB (RBX)  – Rumbek Airport – Rumbek
 HJWW (WUU)  – Wau Airport – Wau
 HSAK        – Akobo Airport – Akobo
 HSAW        – Aweil Airport – Aweil
 HSBR        – Bor Airport – Bor
 HSBT        – Bentiu Airport – Bentiu
 HSFA        – Paloich Airport – Paloich
 HSGO        – Gogrial Airport – Gogrial
 HSKJ        – Kago Kaju Airport – Kago Kaju
 HSKP        – Kapoeta Airport – Kapoeta
 HSMD        – Maridi Airport – Maridi
 HSNM        – Nimule Airport – Nimule
 HSPA        – Pochalla Airport – Pochalla
 HSPI        – Pibor Airport – Pibor
 HSRJ        – Raga Airport – Raga
 HSRN        – Renk Airport – Renk
 HSTO        – Tonj Airport – Tonj
 HSTR        – Torit Airport – Torit
 HSTU        – Tumbura Airport – Tumbura
 HSYA        – Yambio Airport – Yambio
 HSYE        – Yei Airport – Yei
 HSYL        – Yirol Airport – Yirol

HK - Kenya 

 HKAM (ASV) – Amboseli Airport – Amboseli
 HKBA       – Busia Airport – Busia
 HKBR       – Bura East Airport –  Bura
 HKBU       – Bungoma Airport – Bungoma
 HKCC       – Cottars Mara Airport – Cottar's Camp
 HKDA       – Dadaab Airstrip – Dadaab
 HKED       – Eldoret Airstrip – Eldoret
 HKEL (EDL) – Eldoret International Airport – Eldoret
 HKEM       – Embu Airport –  Embu
 HKES (EYS) – Eliye Springs Airport – Eliye Springs
 HKEW       – El Wak Airport – El Wak
 HKFG (KLK) – Kalokol Airport – Kalokol
 HKFT       – Fig Tree Airport – Masai Mara National Park
 HKGA (GAS) – Garissa Airport – Garissa
 HKGT       – Garba Tula Airport – Garba Tula
 HKHB       – Homa Bay Airport – Homa Bay
 HKHO (HOA) – Hola Airport – Hola
 HKIK       – Orly (Olooitikoshi) Airport
 HKIS       – Isiolo Airport – Isiolo
 HKJK (NBO) – Jomo Kenyatta International Airport (formerly Nairobi International Airport) – Nairobi
 HKKA       – Kabarak Airport – Kabarak
 HKKE (KEU) – Keekorok Airport –  Masai Mara
 HKKI (KIS) – Kisumu International Airport – Kisumu
 HKKL (ILU) – Kilaguni Airport – Kilaguni
 HKKR (KEY) – Kericho Airport – Kericho
 HKKT (KTL) – Kitale Airport – Kitale
 HKLO (LOK) – Lodwar Airport – Lodwar
 HKLU (LAU) – Manda Airport – Lamu
 HKLY (LOY) – Loiyangalani Airport – Loiyangalani
 HKMA (NDE) – Mandera Airport – Mandera
 HKMB (RBT) – Marsabit Airport – Marsabit
 HKML (MYD) – Malindi Airport – Malindi
 HKMM       – Migori Airport – Migori
 HKMO (MBA) – Moi International Airport – Mombasa
 HKMY (OYL) – Moyale Lower Airport – Moyale
 HKNI (NYE) – Nyeri Airport – Nyeri
 HKNK (NUU) – Nakuru Airport – Nakuru
 HKNL (NYK) – Nanyuki Airport – Nanyuki
 HKNW (WIL) – Wilson Airport – Nairobi
 HKNY       – Laikipia Air Base – Nanyuki
 HKRE       – Eastleigh Airport – Nairobi
 HKSB (UAS) – Samburu Airport – Samburu
 HKWJ (WJR) – Wajir Airport – Wajir

HL - Libya 

 HLGT (GHT) – Ghat Airport – Ghat
 HLKF (AKF) – Kufra Airport – Kufra
 HLLB (BEN) – Benina International Airport – Benghazi
 HLLM (MJI) – Mitiga International Airport – Tripoli
 HLLQ (LAQ) – Al Abraq International Airport – Bayda
 HLLS (SEB) – Sabha Airport – Sabha
 HLLT (TIP) – Tripoli International Airport – Tripoli
 HLMB (LMQ) – Marsa Brega Airport – Brega
 HLMS (MRA) – Misrata International Airport – Misrata
 HLTD (LTD) – Ghadames Airport – Ghadames

HR - Rwanda 

 HRYG (GYI) – Gisenyi Airport – Gisenyi
 HRYI (BTQ) – Butare Airport – Butare
 HRYR (KGL) – Kigali International Airport (formerly Gregoire Kayibanda Airport) – Kigali
 HRYU (RHG) – Ruhengeri Airport – Ruhengeri
 HRZA (KME) – Kamembe Airport – Cyangugu

HS - Sudan and South Sudan

Sudan 

 HSAT (ATB) – Atbara Airport – Atbarah (Atbara)
 HSDB (EDB) – Eldebba Airport – Eldebba
 HSDN (DOG) – Dongola Airport – Dongola
 HSFS (ELF) – El Fasher Airport – Al-Fashir (El Fasher)
 HSGG (DNX) – Galegu Airport – Dinder
 HSGN (EGN) – Geneina Airport – Geneina
 HSKA (KSL) – Kassala Airport – Kassala
 HSKG (GBU) – Khashm El Girba Airport – Khashm El Girba
 HSKI (KST) – Rabak Airport – Kosti
 HSMR (MWE) – Merowe Airport – Merowe
 HSNH (NUD) – En Nahud Airport – En Nahud
 HSNN (UYL) – Nyala Airport – Nyala
 HSOB (EBD) – El Obeid Airport – El Obeid
 HSPN (PZU) – Port Sudan New International Airport – Port Sudan
 HSSP – Port Sudan Military Airport – Port Sudan
 HSSS (KRT) – Khartoum International Airport – Khartoum
 HSSW (WHF) – Wadi Halfa Airport – Wadi Halfa

South Sudan 
See the section for South Sudan above.

HT - Tanzania 

 HTAR (ARK) – Arusha Airport – Arusha
 HTBU (BKZ) – Bukoba Airport – Bukoba
 HTDA (DAR) – Julius Nyerere International Airport – Dar es Salaam
 HTDO (DOD) – Dodoma Airport – Dodoma
 HTIR (IRI) – Iringa Airport – Iringa
 HTKA (TKQ) – Kigoma Airport – Kigoma
 HTKI (KIY) – Kilwa Masoko Airport – Kilwa Masoko
 HTKJ (JRO) – Kilimanjaro International Airport – Mount Kilimanjaro
 HTLI (LDI) – Lindi Kikwetu Airport – Lindi
 HTLM (LKY) – Lake Manyara Airport – Lake Manyara
 HTMA (MFA) – Mafia Airport – Mafia Island
 HTMB (MBI) – Mbeya Airport – Mbeya
 HTMD (MWN) – Mwadui Airport – Mwadui
 HTMI (XMI) – Masasi Airport – Masasi
 HTMP       – Mpanda Airport – Mpanda
 HTMS (QSI) – Moshi Airport – Moshi
 HTMT (MYW) – Mtwara Airport – Mtwara
 HTMU (MUZ) – Musoma Airport – Musoma
 HTMW (MWZ) – Mwanza Airport – Mwanza
 HTNA (NCH) – Nachingwea Airport – Nachingwea
 HTNJ (JOM) – Njombe Airport – Njombe
 HTPE (PMA) – Pemba Airport – Pemba
 HTSN (SEU) – Seronera Airport – Seronera
 HTSO (SGX) – Songea Airport – Songea
 HTSU (SUT) – Sumbawanga Airport – Sumbawanga
 HTSY (SHY) – Shinyanga Airport – Shinyanga
 HTTB (TBO) – Tabora Airport – Tabora
 HTTG (TGT) – Tanga Airport – Tanga
 HTZA (ZNZ) – Zanzibar Airport – Zanzibar

HU - Uganda 

 HUAJ       – Adjumani Airport – Adjumani
 HUAR (RUA) – Arua Airport – Arua
 HUBU       – Bundibugyo Airport – Bundibugyo
 HUEN (EBB) – Entebbe International Airport – Entebbe (near Kampala)
 HUGU (ULU) – Gulu Airport – Gulu
 HUJI (JIN) – Jinja Airport – Jinja
 HUKB       – Kabale Airport – Kabale
 HUKC       – Kampala Airport – Kampala
 HUKF (KBG) – Kabalega Falls Airport (redesignated HUPA) – Pakuba
 HUKJ       – Kajjansi Airport – Kajjansi
 HUKO       – Kotido Airport – Kotido
 HUKS (KSE) – Kasese Airport – Kasese
 HUMA (MBQ) – Mbarara Airport – Mbarara
 HUMI (KCU) – Masindi Airport – Masindi
 HUNK       – Nakasongola Airport – Nakasongola
 HUPA (PAF) – Pakuba Airfield – Pakuba
 HUSO (SRT) – Soroti Airport – Soroti
 HUTO (TRY) – Tororo Airport – Tororo

References

 
  - includes IATA codes
 Aviation Safety Network - IATA and ICAO airport codes

H
Airports by ICAO code
Airports by ICAO code
Airports by ICAO code
Airports by ICAO code
Airports by ICAO code
Airports by ICAO code
Airports by ICAO code
Airports by ICAO code
Airports by ICAO code
Airports by ICAO code
Airports by ICAO code
Airports by ICAO code